Loxostege darwinialis is a moth in the family Crambidae. It was described by Sauber in 1904. It is found in Central Asia.

References

Moths described in 1904
Pyraustinae